Technomyrmex is a genus of ants in the subfamily Dolichoderinae. With 98 species, it is one of the largest and most diverse ant genera in the Dolichoderinae. The genus distributed throughout the tropical and subtropical zones with most species occurring in the Oriental-Malesian and Afrotropical regions. One species, Technomyrmex albipes is a tramp ant now widespread throughout the tropics due to human activities.

Species

Technomyrmex albicoxis Donisthorpe, 1945
Technomyrmex albipes (Smith, 1861)
Technomyrmex andrei Emery, 1899
Technomyrmex antennus Zhou, 2001
Technomyrmex anterops Bolton, 2007
Technomyrmex antonii Forel, 1902
Technomyrmex arnoldinus Forel, 1913
Technomyrmex australops Bolton, 2007
Technomyrmex bicolor Emery, 1893
Technomyrmex briani Sharaf, 2009
Technomyrmex brunneus Forel, 1895
Technomyrmex butteli Forel, 1913
Technomyrmex camerunensis Emery, 1899
†Technomyrmex caritatis Brandão, Baroni Urbani, Wagensberg & Yamamoto, 1999
Technomyrmex cedarensis Forel, 1915
Technomyrmex certus Bolton, 2007
Technomyrmex cheesmanae Donisthorpe, 1945
Technomyrmex convexifrons Karavaiev, 1926
Technomyrmex curiosus Bolton, 2007
†Technomyrmex deletus Emery, 1891
Technomyrmex detorquens (Walker, 1859)
Technomyrmex difficilis Forel, 1892
Technomyrmex docens Bolton, 2007
Technomyrmex dubius Bolton, 2007
Technomyrmex elatior Forel, 1902
Technomyrmex fisheri Bolton, 2007
Technomyrmex fornax Bolton, 2007
Technomyrmex fulvus (Wheeler, 1934)
Technomyrmex furens Bolton, 2007
Technomyrmex gaudens Bolton, 2007
Technomyrmex gibbosus Wheeler, 1906
Technomyrmex gilvus Donisthorpe, 1941
Technomyrmex gorgona Fernández & Guerrero, 2008
Technomyrmex grandis Emery, 1887
Technomyrmex hades Bolton, 2007
†Technomyrmex hispaniolae (Wilson, 1985)
Technomyrmex horni Forel, 1912
Technomyrmex horrens Bolton, 2007
Technomyrmex hostilis Bolton, 2007
Technomyrmex ilgi (Forel, 1910)
Technomyrmex impressus Bolton, 2007
Technomyrmex indicus Bolton, 2007
Technomyrmex innocens Bolton, 2007
Technomyrmex jocosus Forel, 1910
Technomyrmex kraepelini Forel, 1905
Technomyrmex lasiops Bolton, 2007
Technomyrmex laurenti (Emery, 1899)
Technomyrmex lisae Forel, 1913
Technomyrmex lujae (Forel, 1905)
Technomyrmex madecassus Forel, 1897
Technomyrmex mandibularis Bolton, 2007
Technomyrmex mayri Forel, 1891
Technomyrmex menozzii (Donisthorpe, 1936)
Technomyrmex metandrei Bolton, 2007
Technomyrmex mixtus Bolton, 2007
Technomyrmex modiglianii Emery, 1900
Technomyrmex moerens Santschi, 1913
Technomyrmex montaseri Sharaf, Collingwood & Aldawood, 2011
Technomyrmex myops Bolton, 2007
Technomyrmex nigriventris Forel, 1910
Technomyrmex nitens Bolton, 2007
Technomyrmex obscurior Wheeler, 1928
Technomyrmex pallipes (Smith, 1876)
Technomyrmex parandrei Bolton, 2007
Technomyrmex parviflavus Bolton, 2007
Technomyrmex pilipes Emery, 1899
Technomyrmex pluto Bolton, 2007
Technomyrmex pratensis (Smith, 1860)
Technomyrmex prevaricus Bolton, 2007
Technomyrmex quadricolor (Wheeler, 1930)
Technomyrmex rector Bolton, 2007
Technomyrmex reductus Bolton, 2007
Technomyrmex rotundiceps Karavaiev, 1926
Technomyrmex rusticus Santschi, 1930
Technomyrmex schimmeri Viehmeyer, 1916
Technomyrmex schoedli Bolton, 2007
Technomyrmex schoutedeni Forel, 1910
Technomyrmex semiruber Emery, 1899
Technomyrmex senex Bolton, 2007
†Technomyrmex septentrionalis Zhang, 1989
Technomyrmex setosus Collingwood, 1985
Technomyrmex shattucki Bolton, 2007
Technomyrmex sophiae Forel, 1902
Technomyrmex strenuus Mayr, 1872
Technomyrmex subgracilis Bolton, 2007
Technomyrmex sundaicus (Emery, 1900)
Technomyrmex sycorax Bolton, 2007
Technomyrmex tatius Bolton, 2007
Technomyrmex taylori (Santschi, 1930)
Technomyrmex textor Forel, 1909
Technomyrmex tonsuratus Bolton, 2007
Technomyrmex vapidus Bolton, 2007
Technomyrmex vexatus (Santschi, 1919)
Technomyrmex vitiensis Mann, 1921
Technomyrmex voeltzkowi (Forel, 1907)
Technomyrmex wheeleri (Emery, 1913)
Technomyrmex yamanei Bolton, 2007
Technomyrmex zimmeri (Forel, 1911)

References

External links

Dolichoderinae
Ant genera